Cryptandra orbicularis is a species of flowering plant in the family Rhamnaceae and is endemic to south-eastern Queensland. It is a shrub with more or less round or kidney-shaped leaves and white to creamy-white, tube-shaped flowers.

Description
Both surfaces of the leaves are more or less glabrous. The flowers are borne singly in leaf axils with several elliptic bracts at the base. The petals protrude  beyond the sepal tube, and form a hood over the stamens. Flowering has been observed from August to October, and the fruit is a schizocarp.

Taxonomy and naming
Cryptandra orbicularis was first formally described in 2004 by Anthony Bean in the journal Austrobaileya from specimens collected in Expedition National Park in 2000. The specific epithet (orbicularis) refers to the usual shape of the leaves.

Distribution and habitat
This cryptandra grows in shrubby woodland between Cracow and Rolleston in south-eastern Queensland.

References

orbicularis
Rosales of Australia
Flora of Queensland
Plants described in 2004
Taxa named by Anthony Bean